In ethics, casuistry is a process of reasoning that seeks to resolve moral problems by extracting or extending theoretical rules from a particular case, and reapplying those rules to new instances. This method occurs in applied ethics and jurisprudence. The term is also commonly used as a pejorative to criticize the use of clever but unsound reasoning, especially in relation to moral questions (as in sophistry). It is the "[s]tudy of cases of conscience and a method of solving conflicts of obligations by applying general principles of ethics, religion, and moral theology to particular and concrete cases of human conduct. This frequently demands an extensive knowledge of natural law and equity, civil law, ecclesiastical precepts, and an exceptional skill in interpreting these various norms of conduct." It remains a common tool for applied ethics.

Etymology
According to the Online Etymological Dictionary, the term and its agent noun "casuist", appearing from about 1600, derive from the Latin noun , meaning "case", especially as referring to a "case of conscience". The same source says that "[e]ven in the earliest printed uses the sense was pejorative".

History
Casuistry dates from Aristotle (384–322 BC), yet the zenith of casuistry was from 1550 to 1650, when the Society of Jesus used case-based reasoning, particularly in administering the Sacrament of Penance (or "confession"). The term became pejorative following Blaise Pascal's attack on the misuse of the method in his Provincial Letters (1656–57). The French mathematician, religious philosopher and Jansenist sympathiser attacked priests who used casuistic reasoning in confession to placate wealthy church donors. Pascal charged that aristocratic penitents could confess a sin one day, re-commit it the next, then generously donate to the church and return to re-confess their sin in confidence of being assigned only a nominal penance. These criticisms darkened casuistry's reputation in following centuries. For example, the Oxford English Dictionary quotes a 1738 essay by Henry St. John, 1st Viscount Bolingbroke to the effect that casuistry "destroys, by distinctions and exceptions, all morality, and effaces the essential difference between right and wrong, good and evil"

The 20th century saw a revival of interest in casuistry. In their book The Abuse of Casuistry: A History of Moral Reasoning (1988), Albert Jonsen and Stephen Toulmin argue that it is not casuistry but the abuse of casuistry that has been a problem; that, properly used, casuistry is powerful reasoning. Jonsen and Toulmin offer casuistry as a method for dissolving the contradictory tenets of moral absolutism and moral relativism. In addition, the ethical philosophies of utilitarianism (especially preference utilitarianism) and pragmatism have been identified as employing casuistic reasoning.

Early modernity
The casuistic method was popular among Catholic thinkers in the early modern period. Casuistic authors include Antonio Escobar y Mendoza, whose Summula casuum conscientiae (1627) enjoyed a great success, Thomas Sanchez, Vincenzo Filliucci (Jesuit and penitentiary at St Peter's), Antonino Diana, Paul Laymann (Theologia Moralis, 1625), John Azor (Institutiones Morales, 1600), Etienne Bauny, Louis Cellot, Valerius Reginaldus, and Hermann Busembaum (d. 1668). One of the main theses of casuists was the need to adapt the rigorous morals of the Early Fathers of Christianity to modern conditions and concerns. This led in some extreme cases to justification of usury, homicide, regicide, lying through "mental reservation", adultery and loss of virginity before marriage—all cases registered by Pascal in his Provincial Letters.

The progress of casuistry was interrupted toward the middle of the 17th century by the controversy which arose concerning the doctrine of probabilism, which stipulated that one could choose to follow a "probable opinion", that is, supported by a theologian or another, even if it contradicted a more probable opinion or a quotation from one of the Fathers of the Church. The controversy divided Catholic theologians into two camps, Rigorists and Laxists.

Certain kinds of casuistry were criticized by early Protestant theologians, because it was used in order to justify many of the abuses that they sought to reform. It was famously attacked by the Catholic and Jansenist philosopher Pascal, during the formulary controversy against the Jesuits, in his Provincial Letters as the use of rhetorics to justify moral laxity, which became identified by the public with Jesuitism; hence the everyday use of the term to mean complex and sophistic reasoning to justify moral laxity. By the mid-18th century, "casuistry" had become a synonym for specious moral reasoning. However, Puritans were known for their own development of casuistry.

In 1679 Pope Innocent XI publicly condemned sixty-five of the more radical propositions (stricti mentalis), taken chiefly from the writings of Escobar, Suarez and other casuists as propositiones laxorum moralistarum and forbade anyone to teach them under penalty of excommunication. Despite this papal condemnation, both Catholicism and Protestantism permit the use of ambiguous and equivocal statements in specific circumstances.

Later modernity
G. E. Moore dealt with casuistry in chapter 1.4 of his Principia Ethica, in which he claims that "the defects of casuistry are not defects of principle; no objection can be taken to its aim and object. It has failed only because it is far too difficult a subject to be treated adequately in our present state of knowledge". Furthermore, he asserted that "casuistry is the goal of ethical investigation. It cannot be safely attempted at the beginning of our studies, but only at the end".

Since the 1960s, applied ethics has revived the ideas of casuistry in applying ethical reasoning to particular cases in law, bioethics, and business ethics, so the reputation of casuistry is somewhat rehabilitated.

Pope Francis, a Jesuit, has criticized casuistry as "the practice of setting general laws on the basis of exceptional cases" in instances where a more holistic approach would be preferred.

See also

References

Further reading

 
 
 
 Bliton, Mark J. (1993). The Ethics of Clinical Ethics Consultation: On the Way to Clinical Philosophy (Diss. Vanderbilt)
 
 
 
 
 
 Carney, Bridget Mary. (1993). Modern Casuistry: An Essential But Incomplete Method for Clinical Ethical Decision-Making. (Diss., Graduate Theological Union).
 
 Carson, Ronald A. (1988). "Paul Ramsey, Principled Protestant Casuist: A Retrospective." Medical Humanities Review, Vol. 2, pp. 24–35.
 Chidwick, Paula Marjorie (1994). Approaches to Clinical Ethical Decision-Making: Ethical Theory, Casuistry and Consultation. (Diss., U of Guelph)
 
 
 
 Drane, J.F. (1990). "Methodologies for Clinical Ethics." Bulletin of the Pan American Health Organization, Vol. 24, pp. 394–404.
 Dworkin, R.B. (1994). "Emerging Paradigms in Bioethics: Symposium." Indiana Law Journal, Vol. 69, pp. 945–1122.
 Elliot, Carl (1992). "Solving the Doctor's Dilemma?" New Scientist, Vol. 133, pp. 42–43.
 Emanuel, Ezekiel J. (1991). The Ends of Human Life: Medical Ethics in a Liberal Polity (Cambridge).
 Franklin, James (2001). The Science of Conjecture: Evidence and Probability Before Pascal (Johns Hopkins), ch. 4.
 Gallagher, Lowell (1991). Medusa's Gaze: Casuistry and Conscience in the Renaissance (Stanford)
 
 Green, Bryan S. (1988). Literary Methods and Sociological Theory: Case Studies of Simmel and Weber (Albany)
 
 Houle, Martha Marie (1983). The Fictions of Casuistry and Pascal's Jesuit in "Les Provinciales" (Diss. U California, San Diego)
 
 
 
 
 Jonsen, Albert R. (1986). "Casuistry" in J.F. Childress and J. Macgvarrie, eds. Westminster Dictionary of Christian Ethics (Philadelphia)
 
 
 Jonsen, Albert R. and Stephen Toulmin (1988). The Abuse of Casuistry: A History of Moral Reasoning (California).
 Keenan, James F., S.J. and Thomas A. Shannon. (1995). The Context of Casuistry (Washington).
 Kirk, K. (1936). Conscience and Its Problems, An Introduction to Casuistry (London)
 
 
 
 
 Kuczewski, Mark G. (1994). Fragmentation and Consensus in Contemporary Neo-Aristotelian Ethics: A Study in Communitarianism and Casuistry (Diss., Duquesne U).
 
 
 Long, Edward LeRoy, junior (1954). Conscience and Compromise: an Approach to Protestant Casuistry (Philadelphia, Penn.: Westminster Press)
 
 
 Mackler, Aaron Leonard. Cases of Judgments in Ethical Reasoning: An Appraisal of Contemporary Casuistry and Holistic Model for the Mutual Support of Norms and Case Judgments (Diss., Georgetown U).
 
 
 McCready, Amy R. (1992). "Milton's Casuistry: The Case of 'The Doctrine and Discipline of Divorce.' " Journal of Medieval and Renaissance Studies, Vol. 22, pp. 393–428.
 
 
 
 Odozor, Paulinus Ikechukwu (1989). Richard A. McCormick and Casuistry: Moral Decision-Making in Conflict Situations (M.A. Thesis, St. Michael's College).
 Pack, Rolland W. (1988). Case Studies and Moral Conclusions: The Philosophical Use of Case Studies in Biomedical Ethics (Diss., Georgetown U).
 Pascal, Blaise (1967). The Provincial Letters (London).
 
 Río Parra, Elena del (2008). Cartografías de la conciencia española en la Edad de Oro (Mexico).
 
 Seiden, Melvin (1990). Measure for Measure: Casuistry and Artistry (Washington).
 
 
 Smith, David H. (1991). "Stories, Values, and Patient Care Decisions." in Charles Conrad, ed. The Ethical Nexus: Values in Organizational Decision Making. (New Jersey).
 
 
 Starr, G. (1971). Defoe and Casuistry (Princeton).
 
 Tallmon, James Michael (2001). "Casuistry" in The Encyclopedia of Rhetoric. Ed. Thomas O. Sloane. New York: Oxford University Press, pp. 83–88.
 Tallmon, James Michael (1993). Casuistry and the Quest for Rhetorical Reason: Conceptualizing a Method of Shared Moral Inquiry (Diss., U of Washington).
 
 Taylor, Richard (1984). Good and Evil – A New Direction: A Foreceful Attack on the Rationalist Tradition in Ethics (Buffalo).
 
 
 
 Toulmin, Stephen (1988). "The Recovery of Practical Philosophy." The American Scholar, Vol. 57, pp. 337–352.
 
 
 
 
 Weinstein, Bruce David (1989). The Possibility of Ethical Expertise (Diss. Georgetown U).
 
 
 Wildes, Kevin Wm., S.J. (1993). The View for Somewhere: Moral Judgment in Bioethics (Diss. Rice U).
 
 Zacker, David J. (1991). Reflection and Particulars: Does Casuistry Offer Us Stable Beliefs About Ethics? (M.A. Thesis, Western Michigan U).

External links

 Dictionary of the History of Ideas: "Casuistry"
 Accountancy as computational casuistics, article on how modern compliance regimes in accountancy and law apply casuistry
 Mortimer Adler's Great Ideas – Casuistry
 Summary of casuistry by Jeramy Townsley
 Casuistry – Online Guide to Ethics and Moral Philosophy
 Casuistry – Oxford Encyclopedia of Rhetoric catalogued at she-philosopher.com

 
Scholasticism
Applied ethics
Common law
Legal reasoning
Jurisprudence
Criticism of religion